"I Was Me" is a charity single by American pop rock band Imagine Dragons.

Background
On October 12, 2015, "I Was Me" was released to iTunes Stores for the One4 project with all proceeds going to the UN Refugee Agency to support fleeing refugees, particularly in the Middle East. SAP and Imagine Dragons partnered together to release the song. Lead singer Dan Reynolds wrote an op-ed piece about the crisis for Medium that was published on October 24, 2015.

Charts

References

2015 singles
2015 songs
Charity singles
Imagine Dragons songs
Interscope Records singles
United Nations High Commissioner for Refugees
Universal Music Group singles
Songs written by Wayne Sermon
Songs written by Dan Reynolds (musician)
Songs written by Daniel Platzman
Songs written by Ben McKee